Tarangini may refer to:

 Tarangini (music), the most prominent musical compositions of Narayana Teertha
 INS Tarangini, a tall ship of the Indian Navy
 Tharangini Music, a record label and recording studio founded by singer K. J. Yesudas